The Peshtigo fire was a  large forest fire on October 8, 1871, in northeastern Wisconsin, United States, including much of the southern half of the Door Peninsula and adjacent parts of the Upper Peninsula of Michigan. The largest community in the affected area was Peshtigo, Wisconsin which had a population of approximately 1,700 residents. The fire burned about 1.2 million acres and is the deadliest wildfire in recorded history, with the number of deaths estimated between 1,500 and 2,500. Although the exact number of deaths is debated, mass graves, both those already exhumed and those still being discovered, in Peshtigo and the surrounding areas show that the death toll of the blaze was most likely greater than the 1889 Johnstown flood death toll of 2,200 people or more. 

Occurring on the same day as the more famous Great Chicago Fire, the Peshtigo fire has been largely forgotten, even though it killed far more people. In total, the Great Chicago Fire took one-fifth as many lives as the Peshtigo Fire. "Everybody's heard about the Chicago fire, and that got all the publicity at the time," said a volunteer at the Peshtigo Fire Museum, named Ruth Wiltzius, whose great-grandfather perished while trying to escape. "Peshtigo was a backwards lumber town then—who had ever heard of it? Chicago was the big city. Which one was going to get more attention?" 

Nonetheless, several cities in Michigan, including Holland and Manistee (across Lake Michigan from Peshtigo) and Port Huron (at the southern end of Lake Huron), also had major fires on the same day. These fires, along with many other fires of the nineteenth century had the same basic causes: small fires coupled with unusually dry weather.

Firestorm
Slash-and-burn land management was a common way to clear forest for farming and railroad construction. This allowed for farmers to have good soil for planting which contributed to the fires that burned all summer and into the fall. Due to the benefit of having the controlled fires, many people including immigrants from Europe believed that fire was an ally. On the day of the Peshtigo fire, a cold front moved in from the west, bringing strong winds that fanned the fires out of control and escalated them to massive proportions. 

A firestorm ensued. In the words of Gess and Lutz, in a firestorm "superheated flames of at least 2,000 degrees Fahrenheit ... advance on winds of 110 miles per hour or stronger. The diameter of such a fire ranges from one thousand to ten thousand feet ... When a firestorm erupts in a forest, it is a blowup, nature's nuclear explosion ... "

By the time it was over, between 1.2 and 1.5 million acres of land had been burned. In addition to Peshtigo, 16 other communities were destroyed in the fire.

The value of the property and forest that was destroyed in the fire was estimated to be about 5 million US dollars (about $ in  dollars) Additionally, 2,000,000 trees, saplings, and animals perished in the fire; this had an irrefutable economic impact on the area as well.

An accurate death toll has never been determined because all local records were destroyed in the fire. Estimates vary from 1,200 to 2,400 deaths. 

The 1873 Report to the Wisconsin Legislature listed 1,182 names of dead or missing residents. In 1870, the Town of Peshtigo had 1,749 residents. More than 350 bodies were buried in a mass grave, primarily because so many people had died that there was no one left alive who could identify them. The Peshtigo Fire Cemetery was entered into the National Register of Historic Places which is determined by age, integrity and significance of the site.   

The Rev. Peter Pernin, in his eyewitness account, states that the prolonged drought at that time combined with the factor of human carelessness were omens of the horrible disaster. He also notes how the fire seemed to jump across the Peshtigo River using the bridges and upward air drafts and burn both sides of the town. 

Other survivors reported that the firestorm generated a fire whirl (described as a tornado) that threw rail cars and houses into the air. Many citizens escaped the flames by immersing themselves in the Peshtigo River, wells, or other nearby bodies of water. Some drowned while others succumbed to hypothermia in the frigid river. In one account, a man slit the throats of all his children to spare them from an agonizing death.  

At the same time, another fire burned parts of the Door Peninsula; because of the coincidence, some incorrectly assumed that the Peshtigo fire had jumped across the waters of Green Bay into the Door County regions. However, the fire did not jump across the bay. Most likely, the firestorm spread and created a new ground fire in New Franken which then spread and burned everything northward up until Sturgeon Bay.

Comet hypothesis
Speculation since 1883 has suggested that the start of the Peshtigo and Chicago fires on the same day was not coincidental, but that all the major fires in Illinois, Michigan and Wisconsin that day were caused by impact of fragments from Biela's Comet. This hypothesis was revived in a 1985 book, reviewed in a 1997 documentary, and investigated in a 2004 paper published by the American Institute of Aeronautics and Astronautics. 

Certain behaviors of the Chicago and Peshtigo fires were cited to support the idea of an extraterrestrial cause, such as blue flames (thought to be cometary gases burning) in the basements of houses. However, modern fire theory indicates that the blue color was most likely a product of burning carbon monoxide in the poorly ventilated basements. Additionally, scientists with expertise in the field pointed out that there has never been a credible report of a fire being started by a meteorite.

In any event, no external source of ignition was needed. There were already numerous small fires burning in the area as part of land-clearing operations and similar activities after a tinder-dry summer. All that was necessary to trigger the firestorm, plus the other large fires in the Midwest, was a strong wind from the weather front which had moved in that evening.

Legacy and aftermath 

Following the fire, it took days for help to arrive. By the time that word got to Madison, most of the officials and their aid were going to Chicago, which was being called the Great Fire. Food, clothing, and other aid were quickly sent in order to help survivors, many of whom went to Marinette. All that was left of the Town of Peshtigo were a few buildings and ashes with all personal items being destroyed. 

William Butler Ogden, a politician and lumber company owner, went to Peshtigo with the goal of rebuilding the town. It took years to rebuild and many businesses never reopened. Specifically, the large woodenware factory that supplied jobs to many was never rebuilt, leaving the town to never re-establish their lumber industry. Today, Peshtigo is a typical northeastern Wisconsin town, and has roughly 3,500 residents.

The Peshtigo Fire Museum, just west of U.S. Highway 41, has a small collection of fire artifacts, first-person accounts, and a graveyard dedicated to victims of the tragedy. A memorial commemorating the fire was dedicated on October 8, 2012 at the bridge over the Peshtigo River.

The National Shrine of Our Lady of Good Help, a Marian shrine in Champion, has been established at the site of a chapel where, according to the Shrine, Sister Adele Brise and others sheltered from the fire and were miraculously passed over. According to Sister Adele, in October 1859, she received a vision from the Blessed Virgin Mary with a warning saying "If they do not convert and do not pronounce, my Son will be obligated to punish them". Twelve years later the fire erupted and many people flocked to the church for safety. The people hoped and prayed, saying the rosary and hours later rain came which destroyed the fire. Some of the only things that survived the Peshtigo Fire were the convent, school, chapel and five acres of land that had been consecrated by the Virgin Mary. The only animals that survived were those that were brought to the chapel grounds. Following the fire, people had great faith in the chapel and the Virgin Mary as they believe she saved them. In the following years it has been said that miracles have occurred at the chapel. In one account, a blind girl went to the chapel to pray and came out with the ability to see; however, none of these stories have ever been properly recorded. 

Tornado Memorial County Park is located on the site of the former community of Williamsonville, a small village in Door County, and is named for the fire whirl which occurred there. The park is the only thing left of the small town as the firestorm destroyed everything. Out of the 76 inhabitants of Williamsonville, there were only 19 survivors. As a result of the fire, Williamsonville was wiped off the map as it was never rebuilt. 

The combination of wind, topography and ignition sources that generated the firestorm at the boundary between human settlements and natural terrain, is known as the "Peshtigo paradigm". Those conditions were closely studied by the American and British military during World War II to learn how to recreate firestorms during bombing campaigns against cities in Germany and Japan. Denise Gess, co-author of Firestorm, said, "They actually made a 'demo' first, a little scale model of wooden buildings, and studied how you would drop bombs until it created a firestorm. Something that devastating and that hot."

Rutkow (2012) writes that the event prompted almost no change to the practices of the lumber industry or the way settlers approached life in forests. He notes that in the following decades, the rate of industrial logging increased and the amount of forest fires increased throughout the country, with Wisconsin itself experiencing major fires in 1880, 1891, 1894, 1897, 1908, 1910, 1923, 1931, and 1936. The loss of half a million acres a year was not uncommon.

Depiction in media 
The Peshtigo Fire is discussed in Season 1, Episode 8, of the television series The Gilded Age when downstairs character Jack is discovered putting flowers on the grave of his mother, who died in the tragedy.

See also

Other October 8, 1871 fires
Great Chicago Fire
Great Michigan Fire
Port Huron Fire of 1871

Other fire disasters in the Great Lakes
Great Hinckley Fire of 1894
Baudette fire of 1910
Cloquet fire of 1918
Thumb Fire of 1881 (see also List of Michigan wildfires)

References

Further reading 
 Ball, Jacqueline A. Wildfire! The 1871 Peshtigo Firestorm. New York: Bearport Pub., 2005. .
 
 Holbrook, Stewart. "Fire Makes Wind: Wind Makes Fire". American Heritage, vol. 7, no. 5 (August 1956).
 Leschak, Peter M. Ghosts of the Fireground: Echoes of the Great Peshtigo Fire and the Calling of a Wildland Firefighter, New York:HarperCollins, 2003. 
 Pernin, Peter. "The Great Peshtigo Fire: An Eyewitness Account," Wisconsin Magazine of History, 54: 4 (Summer, 1971), 246–272.
 
 US Department of Commerce, NOAA. “The Great Midwest Wildfires of 1871.” National Weather Service, NOAA's National Weather Service, 4 Oct. 2021.
Wells, Robert W. Fire at Peshtigo. Englewood Cliffs, NJ: Prentice-Hall, 1968.

External links 
 "The Fire Fiend" New York Times, October 13, 1871.
 
 
 
 
 Peshtigo Fire at Wisconsin Historical Society's Dictionary of Wisconsin History
 

1871 in Wisconsin
1871 fires in the United States
1871 natural disasters in the United States
Natural disasters in Wisconsin
Wildfires in Wisconsin
19th-century wildfires